Sharmine Siaotong  (born 9 November 1994) is a Filipino women's international footballer who plays as a midfielder. She is a member of the Philippines women's national football team. She was part of the team at the 2015 AFF Women's Championship. On club level she played for Far Eastern University (FEU) scoring a goal against Hong Kong at the 2015 Ho Chi Minh City International Women Football Tournament and for FEU Lady Tamaraws in Philippines and scored one goal at the UAAP Season 78 football tournaments in 2016.

After graduating from FEU in 2016, Siaotong joined OutKast F.C. which participated in the PFF Women's League.

References

1994 births
Living people
Filipino women's footballers
Philippines women's international footballers
Place of birth missing (living people)
Women's association football midfielders
Far Eastern University alumni
University Athletic Association of the Philippines footballers